Amazon Luna is a cloud gaming platform developed and operated by Amazon. Luna was announced on September 24, 2020, with early access available to subscribers by invitation beginning on October 20, 2020. In its early access state, Amazon Luna featured about 100 different games combined, with an introductory price of $5.99 a month. The platform is powered by Amazon Web Services, has integration with Twitch, and was made available on Windows, Mac, Amazon Fire TV, and iOS (as a progressive web app) on launch, as well as Android shortly after. 

Amazon has partnered with Ubisoft to create a gaming channel exclusive to Luna, giving Luna subscribers access to Ubisoft's titles the same day they release. The Ubisoft+ (Beta) channel costs an additional $14.99 per month.

Luna is currently only available to subscribers within the United States, with international release yet to be confirmed. It is set to launch as Amazon's competitor to other cloud gaming platforms like Xbox Cloud Gaming, PlayStation Plus cloud streaming, and GeForce Now.

Controllers
Luna supports control through keyboard and mouse, the Xbox Wireless Controller, and the DualShock 4 and DualSense controllers.

The Luna Controller is an optional accessory selling for $59.99. It comes in a single color (black) and features dual analog sticks, a D-pad, two sets of shoulder buttons, four main A/B/X/Y face buttons, and four other face buttons. A microphone is built in, allowing support for Amazon Alexa. The controller can connect through Wi-Fi, Bluetooth, or a USB-C cable.

Reception 
In a review of Amazon Luna in March 2021, a CNN article praised the service for its lower price compared to Stadia and Xbox Game Pass Ultimate and praised its user interface, while criticizing occasional lag issues and its initial game lineup. A review from Screen Rant criticized the channel setup, arguing that those who want the full experience will end up paying more than similar services. The review remarked that the service feels misguided, with an unclear target audience, and considered it too impractical to recommend to consumers. However, it also stated that it may be a good replacement to a console for people who prefer using subscription services.

References

External links 
 

Cloud gaming services
Cross-platform software
Amazon (company)
2020 in video gaming
Subscription video game services